Shannon Mary Bilbray-Axelrod (born 1973) is a Democratic member of the Nevada Assembly. She represents the 34th district, which covers parts of the western Las Vegas Valley.

Biography
Bilbray-Axelrod was born in Las Vegas in 1973, and graduated from the University of San Diego. She is the daughter of former U.S. Representative James Bilbray, and her sister, Erin Bilbray, was an unsuccessful 2014 candidate for Nevada's 3rd congressional district.

Bilbray-Axelrod ran for the Assembly in 2016, prevailing in a three-way Democratic primary and defeating Republican Matt Williams in the general election.

In March 2017, it was reported Bilbray-Axelrod has registered in 2016 as a foreign agent on behalf of Saudi Arabia, in order to lobby against the Justice Against Sponsors of Terrorism Act.

Personal life
Bilbray-Axelrod and her husband, Danny Axelrod, have a daughter, Molly.

Political positions
Bilbray-Axelrod supports legalization of marijuana, and supports universal background checks for gun purchases.

Electoral history

References

External links
 
 Campaign website
 Legislative website

1973 births
Living people
Democratic Party members of the Nevada Assembly
Politicians from Las Vegas
University of San Diego alumni
Women state legislators in Nevada
21st-century American politicians
21st-century American women politicians